Charles-Louis Bazin, a French painter, sculptor, engraver, and lithographer, was born in Paris in 1802, where he died in 1859. He was a pupil of Girodet-Trioson and of Gérard, after the latter of whom he engraved a portrait of Albertine de Stael, Duchesse de Broglie.

References
 

1802 births
1859 deaths
Painters from Paris
19th-century engravers
French engravers
19th-century French painters
French male painters
19th-century French sculptors
French male sculptors
19th-century French male artists